Our Time may refer to:

Film
 Our Time (1974 film), a 1974 film directed by Peter Hyams
 Our Time (2018 film), a 2018 film directed by Carlos Reygadas
 Our Times, a 2015 Taiwanese school romance drama film directed by Frankie Chen

Music
 Our Time (album), a 2008 album by The Gordons
 Our Time, a track on the 1999 album Animal Soup by Simon Townshend
 Our Time (Lily Allen song) 2014
 Our Time (Dream single), the ninth single of Japanese pop group Dream

Organizations
 Our Time (nonprofit), an American non-profit created by Matthew Segal